Pilodeudorix aucta, Karsch's diopetes, is a butterfly in the family Lycaenidae. It is found in Guinea (Nimbas), Ivory Coast (Nimbas), Ghana (the Volta Region), Togo, Nigeria (east and the Cross River loop) and western Cameroon.

References

Butterflies described in 1895
Deudorigini
Butterflies of Africa